Alana Marissa Lopesi  is a writer and critic based in Auckland, New Zealand. She has been published in multiple places in New Zealand and Australia, and has been an editor in chief at The Pantograph Punch. Her recent book Bloody Women is a series of essays which describes her experiences as a Samoan woman living in New Zealand.

Biography 
Lopesi is Samoan and is based in Auckland, New Zealand.

Lopesi has been the editor for Design Assembly, where she wrote a regular column Graphic Matters. Between 2017 and 2019 Lopesi was the Editor-in-Chief of The Pantograph Punch, a New Zealand online magazine.

In 2018 Lopesi worked with Sarah Biscarra Dilley (yak tityu tityu yak tiłhini Northern Chumash, Chicana), Freja Carmichael (Quandamooka), Léuli Lunaʻi Eshraghi (Sāmoa) and Tarah Hogue (Métis, Dutch Canadian) to develop The Commute, a series of exhibitions and programs at the Institute of Modern Art in Brisbane, Australia.

In 2019 tattooist Julia Mage’au Gray created some 'tatu' on Lopesi live in front of an audience at a gallery in Auckland – there was a DJ (King Kopesi). Lopesi says, "The work of Mage'au Gray is not only about tatu revival, but the body sovereignty that comes with it."

Other places Lopesi has published in New Zealand include: Metro, North and South, Paperboy, Art New Zealand, HOME Magazine, Aotearotica, Bulletin, E-Tangata and The Spinoff. She has also published in Australian publications including Un Magazine, Broadsheet, Runway, GARAGE Magazine and VICE. Lana writes as a critic on New Zealand art and culture and has been doing this since 2012. In her book Bloody Women Lopesi writes about the 'more than multiple worlds that you need to navigate' as a Samoan woman in New Zealand.

In 2021, Lopesi obtained a PhD at the Auckland University of Technology. The title of her thesis was Moana Cosmopolitan Imaginaries: Toward an Emerging Theory of Moana Art. Lopesi lectures at the School of Art and Design at Auckland University of Technology.

In the 2023 New Year Honours, Lopesi was appointed a Member of the New Zealand Order of Merit, for services to the arts.

Residencies 
Lopesi has held residencies in Taipei, Taiwan and Auckland, Aotearoa New Zealand.

Works 
 2018 – False Divides, book published by Bridget Williams Books
 2019 – Transits and Returns, co-editor (Vancouver Art Gallery; Institute of Modern Art)
 2021 – Bloody Women, published by Bridget Williams Books

References 

New Zealand writers
Living people
Year of birth missing (living people)
Samoan women writers
Members of the New Zealand Order of Merit